was a  of the Imperial Japanese Navy. Her name means "Wind and Clouds".

Design and description
The Yūgumo class was a repeat of the preceding  with minor improvements that increased their anti-aircraft capabilities. Their crew numbered 228 officers and enlisted men. The ships had two Kampon geared steam turbines, each driving one propeller shaft, using steam provided by three Kampon water-tube boilers.

The main armament of the Yūgumo class consisted of six Type 3  guns in three twin-gun turrets, one superfiring pair aft and one turret forward of the superstructure. The guns were able to elevate up to 75° to increase their ability against aircraft, but their slow rate of fire, slow traversing speed, and the lack of any sort of high-angle fire-control system meant that they were virtually useless as anti-aircraft guns. They were built with four Type 96  anti-aircraft guns in two twin-gun mounts, but more of these guns were added over the course of the war. The ships were also armed with eight  torpedo tubes in a two quadruple traversing mounts; one reload was carried for each tube. Their anti-submarine weapons comprised two depth charge throwers for which 36 depth charges were carried.

Construction and career
During the Battle of Midway Kazagumo was assigned to Admiral Nagumo's Strike Force. After the fleet had been attacked, the destroyer assisted in rescuing the survivors of the sinking aircraft carriers. In the Battle of the Eastern Solomons the ship was assigned to Nagumo's Strike Force.

In the Battle of the Santa Cruz Islands the destroyer was assigned to Vanguard Force. She performed troop transport runs to Guadalcanal from 7–10 November 1942. During the Naval Battle of Guadalcanal Kazagumo was assigned to the Bombardment Force, and assisted in the rescue of survivors from the cruiser . The ship returned to doing troop transport runs; on 17 November to Buna and another run on 22 November by way of the Admiralty Islands. She also took part in one troop transport run to Wewak from Rabaul.

Kazagumo was ordered on troop evacuation runs to Guadalcanal 1 and 4 February 1943. She then took part in an evacuation run to the Russell Islands on 7 February. From 17–24 February, the ship escorted a troop convoy from Palau to Wewak. She was then ordered to escort a troop convoy from Palau to Hansa Bay on 6–12 March. The vessel took part in another troop transport run from the Shortlands to Kolombangara on 1 April. Then again to Buka 2–3 April, during which she was damaged by a mine in Kahili Bay on 3 April. Temporary repairs were done by the repair ship Hakkai Maru at Rabaul, 17–18 April. The ship sailed for Japan and was repaired there from 29 April–9 June.

Returning to active duty, Kazagumo took part in a troop evacuation run to Kiska 29 July. The destroyer performed another troop evacuation run to Kolombangara on 28 September. She took part in the Battle of Vella Lavella. Kazagumo returned to transport duties, performing an aircrew transport run from Truk to Kavieng on 31 October-1 November and then a troop transport run to Bougainville on 6 November 1943.

She was torpedoed and sunk by the submarine  at the mouth of Davao Gulf. The destroyer  rescued 133 survivors.

Notes

References

External links
 CombinedFleet.com: Yūgumo-class destroyers
 CombinedFleet.com: Kazagumo history

Yūgumo-class destroyers
World War II destroyers of Japan
Ships sunk by American submarines
Shipwrecks in the Philippine Sea
1941 ships
Maritime incidents in June 1944
Ships built by Uraga Dock Company